Sabahattin is a Turkish given name for males. Variant forms of the name such as Sabahudin are also found in the former Ottoman Empire. Notable people with the name include:

 Prens Sabahaddin (1877–1948), Ottoman sociologist
 Sabahattin Ali (1907–1948), Turkish novelist, short-story writer, poet, and journalist
 Sabahudin Bilalović (1960–2003), Bosnian basketball player
 Sabahudin Bujak (born 1959), Bosnian-Herzegovinian football player
 Sabahattin Burcu (born 1951), Turkish boxer
 Sabahattin Cevheri (born 1950), Turkish politician
 Sabahattin Çakmakoğlu (born 1930), Turkish bureucrat and politician
 Sabahudin Delalić (born 1972), Bosnian sitting volleyball player
 Sabahattin Eyüboğlu (1908–1973), Turkish writer and essayist
 Sabahattin Hamamcıoğlu (born 1966), Turkish alpine skier
 Sabahattin Kalender (1919–2012), Turkish composer
 Sabahudin Kovačevič (born 1986), Slovenian ice hockey player
 Sabahudin Kurt (1935–2018), Bosnian singer
 Sabahattin Kuruoğlu (1937–1995), Turkish footballer
 Sabahattin Oğlago (born 1984), Turkish cross-country skier 
 Sabahattin Özbek (1915–2001), Turkish minister 
 Sebahattin Öztürk (born 1962), Turkish politician 
 Sebahattin Öztürk (born 1969), Turkish wrestler 
 Sabahudin Topalbećirević (born 1964), Bosnian sports commentator 
 Sabahattin Usta (born 1990), Turkish footballer
 Sabahudin Vugdalić (born 1953), Bosnian sports journalist and football player
 

Turkish masculine given names
Bosnian masculine given names